Budget Padmanabham is a 2001 Indian Telugu-language comedy film, produced by Grandi Narayana Rao under the Sri Dhanalakshmi Films banner and directed by S. V. Krishna Reddy. It stars Jagapathi Babu, Ramya Krishna, Ravi Teja and music composed by S. V. Krishna Reddy. The film is a remake of the Tamil movie Budget Padmanabhan (2000).

Plot
Budget Padmanabham is a shrewd and discerning man who is often perceived as miserly due to his eccentricity. However, his actions are driven by his childhood experience of being forced out of his family home by a ruthless moneylender after his parents' death. In an effort to save every penny to reclaim his beloved house, Padmanabham, who is the senior-most employee in a private firm, agrees to a proposal by his colleague Ramya, who is a spendthrift. Ramya offers to give him her entire salary to help him repay the debt, and they get married with the condition that they must not have children until the loan is cleared. 

However, their troubles begin when Padmanabham's cousin sister Vijaya, brother-in-law Totti Subramanyam, and Ramya's brother Ravi move in with them. Matters worsen when Ramya becomes pregnant with triplet boys and struggles to balance her responsibilities at work and home. Padmanabham hires a maid named Sonali to assist them, but Ramya grows suspicious of their relationship and Sonali's whereabouts. When Ramya confronts Padmanabham about her suspicions, he tries to explain the situation, but she remains unconvinced.

Padmanabham later discovers that his boss's son, Anil, is married to Sonali and is hiding her from his father, who wants to harm her. Anil asks Padmanabham to keep Sonali's whereabouts a secret from Ramya, which leads to a rift in their marriage. Despite Ramya's growing animosity towards him, Padmanabham works tirelessly to accumulate the necessary funds to repay the loan. However, on the way to the hospital where Sonali is in labor, he and Sonali are attacked by his boss's goons, who steal the cash he had brought to pay off the loan.

Despite this setback, Padmanabham manages to get Sonali admitted to the hospital and convinces his boss to regret his actions. Upon returning home, he discovers that the stolen money has been recovered and the moneylender who had taken it has had a change of heart and repents his actions. With Anil's help, Padmanabham is able to win back his house, and Ramya begs for forgiveness. The movie ends on a happy note with Sonali giving birth to triplet girls.

Cast

Soundtrack
Music composed by S. V. Krishna Reddy. Lyrics written by Chandrabose. Music released on Supreme Music Company.

References

External links
 

2001 films
Telugu remakes of Tamil films
Films directed by S. V. Krishna Reddy
Films scored by S. V. Krishna Reddy
2000s Telugu-language films
Indian drama films
Films about marriage
2001 drama films